The Sydney 2009 World Masters Games, the seventh edition of a four–yearly event that has developed into the world’s largest multi-sport event in terms of participation, was held from 10 October to 18 October 2009 in Sydney, the largest city in Australia and the capital city of New South Wales.

Open to sportspeople of all abilities and most ages – the minimum age criterion ranges between 25 and 35 years depending on the sport – the Sydney 2009 World Masters Games included competitors from more than 100 countries who competed in 28 sports.

Many of the Sydney 2009 World Masters Games sports competitions took place at 2000 Olympic Games venues, something that was not the case to any significant degree at any of the previous six World Masters Games. The Sydney International Regatta Centre, the Sydney International Shooting Centre and several Sydney Olympic Park facilities, including the Sydney Olympic Park Aquatic Centre, the Sydney Olympic Park Archery Centre and the Sydney Olympic Park Athletic Centre to list just three, were just some of the sites at which Sydney 2009 World Masters Games competitors competed.

Sports 

The Sydney 2009 World Masters Games featured 28 sports – 15 core sports that are mandatory for all events under the auspices of the International Masters Games Association and 13 optional sports that the Sydney 2009 World Masters Games Organising Committee proposed to the International Masters Games Association.

Advisory Committee 
Appointed by the New South Wales Government to advise the New South Wales Minister for Sport and Recreation and the Chief Executive Officer of the Sydney 2009 World Masters Games Organising Committee on all aspects of the planning and staging of the Sydney 2009 World Masters Games, the Sydney 2009 World Masters Games Advisory Committee, as of March 2009, comprised these seven people:

Organising Committee 
Headed by Shane O'Leary, the Sydney 2009 World Masters Games Organising Committee comprised five divisions with, as of March 2009, its key personnel being:

See also 
 World Masters Games

References

External links 
 Sydney 2009 World Masters Games website

2009 in multi-sport events
2009 in Australian sport
2009
International sports competitions hosted at Sydney Olympic Park
Multi-sport events in Australia